The 1974 Pioneer Bowl was a college football bowl game in Texas, played between the Central Michigan Chippewas and Louisiana Tech Bulldogs at Memorial Stadium in Wichita Falls. The fourth edition of the Pioneer Bowl, it was one of two semifinals in the NCAA Division II playoffs played on December 7.

Game summary

Scoring summary

Statistics

References

Pioneer Bowl
Central Michigan Chippewas football bowl games
Louisiana Tech Bulldogs football bowl games
Pioneer Bowl
Pioneer Bowl